Keeney's Knob is a mountain of the Ridge-and-Valley Appalachians in Summers County, West Virginia. It is the highest point in Summers County. The mountain is the site of the WVNS-TV transmitter. The city nearest to Keeney's Knob is Alderson.

References

Mountains of West Virginia
Landforms of Summers County, West Virginia